Alexandrovka is a rural locality (a selo) and the administrative center of Aleksandrovsky Selsoviet, Suyetsky District, Altai Krai, Russia. The population was 502 as of 2013. There are 5 streets.

Geography 
Alexandrovka is located 16 km southeast of Verkh-Suyetka (the district's administrative centre) by road. Ukrainsky is the nearest rural locality.

References 

Rural localities in Suyetsky District